Wabash Valley Motor Company was a historic commercial building located in downtown Evansville, Indiana.  It was built in 1919.  It was in Chicago school style architecture. It has been demolished.

It was listed on the National Register of Historic Places in 1982 and delisted in 2011.

References

Former National Register of Historic Places in Indiana
Commercial buildings on the National Register of Historic Places in Indiana
Commercial buildings completed in 1919
Buildings and structures in Evansville, Indiana
National Register of Historic Places in Evansville, Indiana
Chicago school architecture in Indiana